Mars is a ghost town in Van Zandt County, Texas, United States.

Once a retail center for the surrounding community, all that remains of the settlement is a church.

History
Mars was settled by brothers John and Henry Marrs.

The settlement was a retail trading center, and had two mercantile stores, a blacksmith shop, and a cotton gin and grist mill.

The Pleasant Ridge Church and school were established in 1871.

In 1891, a post office was established, originally called "Acme".  The name was changed to "Mars" seven years later.  The post office closed in 1907.

The population of Mars was over 100 in 1915, and had declined to 50 in 1945.

The Pleasant Ridge Church is all that remains of the settlement.

References

Geography of Van Zandt County, Texas
Ghost towns in East Texas